{{Infobox royalty|consort=yes
| name         = Flavia Maximiana Theodora
| title        = 
| image        = Bronze-Flavia Maximiana Theodora-trier RIC 65.jpg
| image_size   = 250px
| alt          = 
| caption      = Flavia Maximiana Theodora. On the reverse, the goddess Pietas.
| succession   = Roman empress
| reign        = 305–306
| birth_date   = c. 275
| birth_place  = 
| death_date   = before 337
| death_place  = 
| burial_place = 
| spouse       = Constantius Chlorus
| issue        = 
| issue-link   = 
| issue-pipe   = 
| father       = Uncertain, perhaps Afranius Hannibalianus or Emperor Maximian
| mother       = Uncertain, perhaps Eutropia
}}
Flavia Maximiana Theodora (c. 275 – before 337) was a Roman empress, wife of Constantius Chlorus.

She is often referred to as a stepdaughter of Emperor Maximian by ancient sources, leading to claims by historians Otto Seeck and Ernest Stein that she was born from an earlier marriage between Eutropia, wife of Maximian, and Afranius Hannibalianus. This man was consul in 292 and praetorian prefect under Diocletian.

Timothy Barnes challenges this view stating that all "stepdaughter sources" derive their information from the partially unreliable work Kaisergeschichte'' (written in the 4th century), while more reliable sources refer to Theodora as Maximian's natural daughter. He concludes that she was born no later than c. 275 to an unnamed earlier wife of Maximian, possibly one of Hannibalianus' daughters.

Before 21 April 289, Theodora married Flavius Valerius Constantius (later known as Constantius Chlorus), after he had divorced from his first wife, Helena, to strengthen his political position. The couple had six children:
Flavius Dalmatius;
Julius Constantius, father of Roman emperor Julian and of the unnamed wife of Constantius II;
Hannibalianus;
Anastasia, who was to marry Bassianus;
Flavia Julia Constantia, wife of Roman emperor Licinius;
Eutropia, mother of Nepotianus.

References

Bibliography

 Barnes, Timothy D.. The New Empire of Diocletian and Constantine. Cambridge, MA: Harvard University Press, 1982.

External links 

270s births
4th-century deaths
3rd-century Roman women
4th-century Roman empresses
Constantinian dynasty
Daughters of Roman emperors
Flavii